Bakero is a Spanish surname.  Notable people with the surname include:

  Itziar Bakero (born 1969), Spanish former footballer
  Jon Bakero (born 1996), Spanish footballer 
  Jon Bakero (born 1971), Spanish retired footballer 
  José Mari Bakero (born 1963), Spanish retired footballer
  Santiago Bakero (born 1958), Spanish retired footballer 

Surnames of Spanish origin